The Parit Sulong Massacre was a Japanese war crime committed by members of the Imperial Japanese Army on 22 January 1942 in the village of Parit Sulong, British Malaya. Soldiers of the Imperial Guards Division summarily executed approximately 150 wounded Australian and Indian prisoners of war who had surrendered.

Prelude 
During the Battle of Muar at 7:00 on 20 January 1942, soldiers of both the Australian 8th Division and the 45th Indian Infantry Brigade under the command of Lieutenant Colonel  Charles Groves Wright Anderson embarked on a fighting withdrawal from Bukit Bakri. The retreating column consisted of seven officers and 190 men of the 2/29th Australian battalion, in addition to two Indian detachments. The force withdrew in fifty vehicles carrying wounded men, ammunition and a meager supply of food. 

The column was ambushed repeatedly throughout 20 January, however the column eventually came to rest in thick jungle in the evening. On the morning of 21 January, the retreating column continued progress and reached the outskirts of the village of Parit Sulong at 9:30. The village had been in Allied hands up until 19 January, when the local British detachment retreated into the jungle. The village was now firmly in Japanese hands, with units prepared to attack the retreating column which by now was low on ammunition, food and water. 

At 11:00, Anderson led an attack on the village which managed to capture the village, however the local bridge and only means of retreat remained in Japanese hands. At 17:00 under request from medical officers, Anderson ordered two ambulances loaded with dying men to approach the bridge and request passage to friendly lines. However, the Japanese officer at the bridge refused this request. 

With all attempts to capture the bridge failing, Anderson ordered all able-bodied soldiers to disperse into the jungle and return to Allied lines. Approximately 150 Australian and Indian soldiers were too seriously injured to move, and under the command of Captain Rewi Snelling, were left to surrender to Japanese forces. Some accounts estimate that as many as 300 Allied troops were taken prisoner at Parit Sulong.

Incident
Upon the departure of Anderson and all able-bodied soldiers, Snelling approached the Japanese and offered his surrender along with all the remaining soldiers. The approximately 150 Australian and Indian soldiers, now prisoners of war, were immediately subjected to beatings and the killing of those unable to move. The remaining soldiers were herded into a nearby building where they were stripped naked and kept in overcrowded rooms and denied medical attention and water. During this time, Japanese Imperial Guard soldiers beheaded the Indian soldiers and randomly shot at others. After sometime, the remaining soldiers were forced outside where Imperial Guard soldiers kicked and beat the wounded prisoners of war with their rifle butts. At least some of them were tied up with wire in the middle of the road and machine-gunned. The Japanese then poured petrol over the bodies, with some still alive, and set them alight. According to Russell Braddon "after their incineration...systematically run over, back and forwards, by Japanese driven trucks." Anecdotal accounts by local people also reported POWs being tied together with wire and forced to stand on a bridge, before a Japanese soldier shot one of them, causing the rest to fall into the Simpang Kiri river and drown.

Aftermath

Lt Ben Hackney of the Australian 2/29th Battalion feigned death and managed to escape. He crawled through the countryside for six weeks with two broken legs, before he was recaptured. Hackney survived internment in Japanese POW camps, and was part of the labour force on the notorious Burma Railway. He and two other survivors gave evidence regarding the massacre to Allied war crimes investigators.

The commander of the Imperial Guards, Lt Gen. Takuma Nishimura, was later in charge of occupation forces in eastern Singapore. He was indirectly involved in the Sook Ching massacre in Singapore. Nishimura retired from the Japanese army in 1942 and was made military Governor of Sumatra. Following the war, he was tried by a British military court in relation to the Sook Ching massacre. Nishimura received a life sentence, of which he served four years. As he returned to Japan, Nishimura was removed from a ship at Hong Kong by Australian military police and charged in relation to the Parit Sulong massacre. Nishimura was taken to Manus Island in the Territory of New Guinea, where he faced an Australian military court. Evidence was presented stating that Nishimura had ordered the shootings at Parit Sulong and the destruction of bodies. He was convicted and executed by hanging on 11 June 1951.

In 1996, Australian journalist Ian Ward published Snaring the Other Tiger, which suggested that the Australian Army prosecutor, Captain James Godwin—a former Royal New Zealand Air Force pilot who had been ill-treated as a POW in Sumatra—had "manipulated" evidence to implicate Nishimura. Ward states that Godwin took no action on the testimony of Lieutenant Fujita Seizaburo, who reportedly took responsibility for the Parit Sulong massacre. Fujita was not charged and his fate is unknown. Extensive research conducted by Professor Gregory Hadley and James Oglethorpe and published in the Journal of Military History in 2007 subsequently showed that the evidence that purported to indict James Godwin was a later fabrication created to further political causes in the 1990s.

See also
 List of massacres in Malaysia

Footnotes

References
 Braddon, Russell, 1951, The Naked Island,  Penguin Books, Melbourne,
 Findlay, Iain, 1991, Savage Jungle – An Epic Struggle for Survival, Simon & Schuster, Sydney.
 MacKay's Betrayal: Solving the Mystery of the "Sado Island Prisoner-of-War Massacre" The Journal of Military History - Volume 71, Number 2, April 2007, pp. 441-464
 Mant, Gilbert, 1996, Massacre at Parit Sulong, Kangaroo Press, Kenthurst.
 Silver, Lynette, 2004, The Bridge at Parit Sulong – An Investigation of Mass Murder, The Watermark Press, Boorowa. .
 Wigmore, Lionel, 1957, The Japanese Thrust – Australia in the War of 1939-1945, AWM, Canberra.

External links

Military history of Malaya during World War II
Massacres in 1942
1942 in British Malaya
Massacres committed by Japan
World War II massacres
Military history of Australia during World War II
1942 in Japan
Mass murder in 1942
January 1942 events
Massacres in Malaysia
World War II prisoner of war massacres
Japanese war crimes